John Allister "Jack" Nibloe (1 June 1939 – 12 November 1964) was an English footballer who played in The Football League for Doncaster Rovers, Sheffield United, Stockport County and Stoke City. He was involved in a car crash in 1964 and he died of his injuries. His father Joe was also a footballer.

Career
Nibloe was born in Sheffield and began his career with local club Sheffield United in 1958. He played 26 matches for the "Blades" in three seasons scoring five goals in 1960–61 as they gained promotion to the top tier. Nibloe was though sold to Stoke City where he played 21 times in 1961–62 scoring five goals. After managing to make just two appearances in 1962–63, Tony Waddington let Nibloe sign for Fourth Division Doncaster Rovers. At Belle Vue he scored eight goals in 43 matches combining his time doing national service in Germany flying back on week ends for the matches. In August 1964 he joined Stockport County, scoring five goals in 24 matches before he was involved in a fatal car accident near Stocksbridge on 12 November 1964 at the age of just 25.

Career statistics
Source:

References

External links
 

English footballers
Stoke City F.C. players
Sheffield United F.C. players
Doncaster Rovers F.C. players
Stockport County F.C. players
English Football League players
1939 births
1964 deaths
Association football forwards
Road incident deaths in England
English people of Scottish descent